The IMOCA 60 Class yacht Hugo Boss 7 was designed by VPLP, Alex Thompson Racing and Gurit and launched in the 2019 after being built Carrington Boats based in Hythe, England. The boat contained a number of innovative feature and was the first IMOCA to have a fully enclosed cockpit the hull form was also optimised for the semi foiling nature of the class.

Racing Results

Timeline

2018 Hugo Boss 7
Construction of the boat started under the name Rockliffe Bill III

2019 Hugo Boss 7

2020 Hugo Boss 7

2021 Hugo Boss 7

2022 Hublot
At the end of 2021 Alan Roura purchased the boat.

References 

Individual sailing yachts
2010s sailing yachts
Sailing yachts designed by VPLP
Vendée Globe boats
IMOCA 60
Sailboat types built in the United Kingdom